Iman Shirazi (ایمان شیرازی in Persian, born 11 March 1992 in Isfahan) is an Iranian footballer.

References

1992 births
Zob Ahan Esfahan F.C. players
Rah Ahan players
Giti Pasand players
Living people
Association football defenders
Iranian footballers
Sportspeople from Isfahan